Thiri Mahar Thu Mingalar Sandar Dewi, commonly known as Magway Mibaya, was a senior queen consort of King Mindon during the late Konbaung dynasty.

She was a daughter of King Tharrawaddy and his consort Kyapin Mibaya. She was a Princess of Taungtha during the reign of her father. Being a half-sister of King Mindon, she was promoted to a Nanzwe Mibaya and received the appanage of Magway when he ascended the throne.

King Mindon and Magway Mibaya gave birth to Mingin Supaya and Pyinzi Supaya.

She was not compatible with the Queen of the Central Palace Hsinbyumashin. After granting permission from King Mindon, to avoid the beset caused by Hsinbyumashin faction in the palace, she was relinquished her insignia of Mibaya to leave the palace and married an ordinary merchant.

Notes

References

See also 
 Konbaung dynasty
 List of Burmese consorts

Konbaung dynasty
Burmese Buddhists
Queens consort of Konbaung dynasty
Year of birth missing
Year of death missing